Vettor Pisani may refer to:
Vettor Pisani, a Venetian admiral
Italian submarine Vettor Pisani
Italian cruiser Vettor Pisani, armoured cruiser built for the Royal Italian Navy 
Vettor Pisani (corvette), Italian naval corvette that left Italy in 1882 for a three-year scientific voyage round the world.